Tadeusz Piotr Parpan (born 16 November 1919 in Kraków, died 21 April 1990, also in Kraków) was a Polish soccer player, also a graduate of the Kraków Technical University (Politechnika Krakowska).

Parpan represented Cracovia (1945–1950), Garbarnia Kraków (1951–52) and the Polish National Team, he played in midfield, later - as a defender. With Cracovia, in 1948 was the champion of Poland, with the national team played in the late 1940s in 20 games, most of them as the captain. He was also one of candidates to play in the team of Europe in 1947. During Second World War was a member of the Armia Krajowa (Polish Home Army). After finishing career, worked as a coach and a teacher at Politechnika Krakowska. Up to this day Parpan is a well-remembered symbol of Cracovia's greatness.

External links
Tadeusz Parpan in KS Cracovia online encyclopedia

1919 births
1990 deaths
Polish footballers
MKS Cracovia (football) players
Poland international footballers
Polish football managers
MKS Cracovia managers
Footballers from Kraków
Association football defenders
Association football midfielders
Tadeusz Kościuszko University of Technology alumni